Naomi Metzger (born 18 April 1998) is a British track and field athlete who competes in the triple jump. She holds a personal best of 14.15 m (set in 2018) and is a five-time British champion. She represented her country at the 2018 European Athletics Championships and the 2019 European Athletics Indoor Championships.

Career
Ogbeta began taking part in athletics at the age of 13, signing up with Salford Metropolitan Athletics Club. She won two Greater Manchester schools titles over 200 metres in 2012 and 2013. She joined Trafford AC in Manchester in 2014 and, after a switch to the triple jump, she won the English Schools' Athletics Championships. Having won her first English under-20 title, she made her international debut at the 2015 World Youth Championships in Athletics and narrowly missed out on the final, jumping the same distance of 12.75 m as qualifier Yelena Drozhilina. In 2016 she was the English Under-20 Champion both indoors and out. Ogbeta won a third under-20 English title in 2017 and was indoor and outdoor champion at the British University Championships. Her career reached new heights with a win at the 2017 British Athletics Championships and a bronze medal at the 2017 European Athletics U20 Championships.

Ogbeta began 2018 with a runner-up finish at the 2018 British Indoor Athletics Championships, then wins at the BUCS Championships and the England U23 Championships. She repeated as national champion at the 2018 British Athletics Championships, gained selection for the British team at the Athletics World Cup, where she was sixth, and the 2018 European Athletics Championships, where she was twelfth in her first major final having set a personal best of 14.15 m in qualifying. She won at the 2019 British Indoor Athletics Championships with 14.05 m – her first clearance over fourteen metres indoors. She was 2 centimetres off qualifying for the final at the 2019 European Athletics Indoor Championships, taking ninth place. She won the English U23 title and a third straight British title at the 2019 British Athletics Championships. She placed fourth at the 2019 European Athletics U23 Championships and seventh at the 2019 European Team Championships Super League that summer. She was invited to compete at the 2019 World Athletics Championships based on her IAAF world ranking, but was not selected for the team by British Athletics. Instead she attended the championships in a media capacity, providing an athlete perspective in the BBC's television coverage.

She became British champion for the fourth successive year when winning the triple jump event at the 2020 British Athletics Championships with a jump of 13.44 metres.

Personal life
She lives in Salford. Her brother, Nathaniel Ogbeta, is a footballer. She attended the University of Manchester, studying politics and quantitative methods, and was a member of the comedy society there. She was a member of the Salford Youth Council and has appeared on BBC News television and radio, discussing Brexit. She is of Nigerian and Jamaican heritage.

International competitions

National titles
British Athletics Championships
Triple jump: 2017, 2018, 2019
British Indoor Athletics Championships
Triple jump: 2018, 2019, 2020

References

External links

European Athletics biography

1998 births
Living people
Sportspeople from Salford
Sportspeople from Manchester
British female triple jumpers
English female triple jumpers
British Athletics Championships winners
English sportspeople of Nigerian descent
English sportspeople of Jamaican descent
Alumni of the University of Manchester
BBC sports presenters and reporters
Commonwealth Games bronze medallists for England
Commonwealth Games medallists in athletics
Athletes (track and field) at the 2022 Commonwealth Games
Medallists at the 2022 Commonwealth Games